"Baião Ca-Room' Pa Pa" is a song written by Humberto Teixeira and Luiz Gonzaga with an English version by Ray Gilbert, engraved by Carmen Miranda in 1950 and featured in the film Nancy Goes to Rio from MGM. It is a "Gay Latin lilt from Miranda's flicker" said Billboard magazine.

References

External links
Gravações americanas de Carmen Miranda

1950 songs
Carmen Miranda songs
The Andrews Sisters songs
Songs with lyrics by Ray Gilbert
Songs written by Humberto Teixeira